Roin Kvaskhvadze (born 31 May 1989) is a Georgian professional footballer who plays as a goalkeeper for Torpedo Kutaisi.

He has featured for the Georgia national under-21 football team. He has also earned call-ups to the Georgia national football team.

Playing career 

Kvaskhvadze made two appearances for Zestafoni in the qualifying round for the 2008–09 UEFA Cup (now the Europa League).

Honours
 FC Zestafoni
Erovnuli Liga: 2
 2010–11, 2011–12
Georgian Cup: 1
 2007–08
 Georgian Super Cup: 2
 2011, 2012
 FC Torpedo Kutaisi
Erovnuli Liga: 1
 2017
Georgian Cup: 3
 2016, 2018, 2022
 Georgian Super Cup: 2
 2018, 2019
 FC Dinamo Tbilisi 
Erovnuli Liga: 2
 2019, 2020
 Georgian Super Cup: 1
 2021

References

External links 
Profile on FC Zestafoni Official Site

Footballers from Georgia (country)
Expatriate footballers from Georgia (country)
Sportspeople from Kutaisi
1989 births
Living people
Association football goalkeepers
FC Zestafoni players
FC Torpedo Kutaisi players
Othellos Athienou F.C. players
Pafos FC players
FC Dinamo Tbilisi players
Erovnuli Liga players
Cypriot First Division players
Georgia (country) international footballers
Georgia (country) under-21 international footballers
Expatriate footballers in Cyprus